Poleo is a Spanish surname. Notable people with the surname include:

Ivis Poleo (born 1963), Venezuelan swimmer
Patricia Poleo (born 1965), Venezuelan journalist
Rafael Poleo (born 1937), Venezuelan journalist and politician

It is also the Spanish word for Pennyroyal a minty herb used in Oaxaca and the surrounding area as a hangover cure.

Spanish-language surnames